Mary Terstegge Meagher Plant (born October 27, 1964) is an American former competition swimmer, Olympic champion, and world record-holder.  In 1981 she bettered her own existing world records in the 100-meter butterfly (57.93) and 200-meter butterfly (2:05.96).  These times would stand as the respective world records for 18 and 19 years, and are considered to be among the greatest sports performances ever.

Early life
Meagher is the daughter of two-time Notre Dame basketball letterman James L. Meagher.  She was a competitive athlete from an early age.  At the 1979 Pan American Games in San Juan, Puerto Rico, she set her first world record—at the age of 14—in the 200-meter butterfly.  "When she was a teenager, Mary showed no weaknesses," reflected Dennis Pursley, one of her early coaches. "Every athlete I've ever known had some form of weakness, be it in terms of motivation, technique or physical attributes, but Mary was the exception." She graduated from the Sacred Heart Academy high school in Louisville, Kentucky, alongside her sister, future U.S. Representative Anne Northup.

1980 Boycott and on
Meagher was expected to compete for medals at the 1980 Summer Olympics in Moscow, Russia.  However, Meagher, along with the rest of the United States Olympic team, never got her chance due to the American-led boycott of the Moscow Olympics.

However, in 1981 Meagher gave one of the most memorable performances in competitive swimming at the U.S. Swimming National Championships held in Brown Deer, Wisconsin in 1981. At the meet, Meagher set world records in both the 200-meter and 100-meter butterfly, the two primary distances at which the butterfly is contested in competitive swimming.  The times for both records were considered astonishing, especially the record of 57.93 seconds that Meagher set in the 100-meters—a drop of over a second.  Both times would stand as the world records for nearly two decades: American swimmer Jenny Thompson lowered the 100-meter record in 1999, while Susie O'Neill of Australia set the record in the 200-meter a year later.  Some have argued that Meagher's records in the butterfly were among the most impressive records ever set in sport, let alone swimming, ranking among such noteworthy records as Bob Beamon's long jump world record in 1968.  These two swims led Meagher to being named Female World Swimmer of the Year by Swimming World Magazine, which she again won in 1985.

Meagher attended the University of California, Berkeley, where she swam for the California Golden Bears swimming and diving team in National Collegiate Athletic Association (NCAA) and Pacific-10 Conference competition.  She received the Honda Sports Award for Swimming and Diving twice, recognizing her as the outstanding college female swimmer of the year in 1984–85 and again in 1986–87. In 1987, she also won the Honda Broderick Cup as the nation's top female collegiate athlete. She graduated from the University of California in 1987 with a Bachelor of Arts degree in social sciences.

At the 1984 Summer Olympics in Los Angeles, Meagher won gold medals in both the 100-meter and 200-meter butterfly races, along with another gold by swimming the butterfly leg of the women's 4×100-meter medley relay for the winning U.S. team in the event final.  Returning to compete at the 1988 Summer Olympics in Seoul, South Korea, Meagher won a bronze medal in the 200-meter butterfly.  By the time she left competitive swimming, Meagher had won 24 U.S. national swimming titles.

Personal life
Meagher was the 10th of 11 siblings. She married former speed skater Mike Plant. They now live in Peachtree City, Georgia, with their two children, Maddie and Drew. Mike Plant's brother and Meagher's brother-in-law, Tom Plant, was also a speed skater and Olympian.  Meagher's older sister Anne Meagher Northup served as a US Congresswoman.

In Louisville a swimming complex is named for Meagher, and a street is named in her honor in Elizabethtown, Kentucky.

See also

 List of multiple Olympic gold medalists at a single Games
 List of Olympic medalists in swimming (women)
 List of University of California, Berkeley alumni
 List of World Aquatics Championships medalists in swimming (women)
 World record progression 100 metres butterfly
 World record progression 200 metres butterfly

References

External links

 
 
 
 

1964 births
Living people
American female butterfly swimmers
American female freestyle swimmers
California Golden Bears women's swimmers
World record setters in swimming
Olympic bronze medalists for the United States in swimming
Olympic gold medalists for the United States in swimming
People from Peachtree City, Georgia
Sportspeople from Louisville, Kentucky
Sportspeople from the Atlanta metropolitan area
Sacred Heart Academy (Louisville) alumni
Swimmers at the 1979 Pan American Games
Swimmers at the 1983 Pan American Games
Swimmers at the 1984 Summer Olympics
Swimmers at the 1988 Summer Olympics
World Aquatics Championships medalists in swimming
Medalists at the 1988 Summer Olympics
Medalists at the 1984 Summer Olympics
Pan American Games gold medalists for the United States
Pan American Games medalists in swimming
Universiade medalists in swimming
Sportswomen from Kentucky
Universiade gold medalists for the United States
Universiade silver medalists for the United States
Medalists at the 1985 Summer Universiade
Medalists at the 1979 Pan American Games
Medalists at the 1983 Pan American Games